The Twin State Mutual Aid Fire Association ("Twin State") is the dispatch center and coordinating agency for fire and emergency medical services operations in 23 towns in Grafton County, New Hampshire, and Orange County and Caledonia County in Vermont. Dispatching duties are handled by the Grafton County Sheriff's Department stationed in North Haverhill, New Hampshire.

Most of the departments in the Twin State system rely heavily on volunteer fire and EMS personnel, although positions are staffed by full-time members.  Some departments like Littleton have a mix of full-time and on-call firefighters, while other departments like Landaff are entirely volunteer.

Private and municipal ambulance services are used in the service area. Two such services are run by Calex Ambulance Service in St. Johnsbury and Woodsville Ambulance in Haverhill. Individual towns contract for their services. Some towns like Lisbon use a Life Squad or FAST (First Aid Stabilization Team) Squad, which is a first responder corps staffed by paid volunteers in addition to the ambulance service. Littleton Regional Hospital runs the Littleton Regional Paramedic service, which provides advanced life support for the greater Littleton area. 

All radio dispatches use the frequency 154.4000 under the callsign KSI-676.

Service area
The following towns are served by Twin State Mutual Aid:
New Hampshire
 Bath
 Bethlehem
 Carroll (including Twin Mountain)
 Easton
 Franconia
 Haverhill (including North Haverhill and Woodsville)
 Landaff
 Lincoln
 Lisbon
 Littleton
 Lyman 
 Monroe
 Piermont
 Sugar Hill
 Woodstock

Vermont
 Barnet
 Groton
 Newbury (including village of Wells River)
 Ryegate

Some towns like Benton and Lyman do not have their own fire departments and contract with surrounding towns to service their calls.

External links
New Hampshire Federation of Mutual Fire Aid Associations Statewide Fire Mobilization Plan
 Lisbon Life Squad
 Franconia, NH Fire Department
 Landaff, NH Fire Department
 Lisbon, NH Fire Department
 Littleton, NH Fire Department
 Sugar Hill, NH Fire Rescue
 Sugar Hill, NH Fire Rescue Emergency Dispatch Maps
 Peacham, VT Fire Department
 Littleton Regional Hospital

References
 Scanner New England
 Grafton County Sheriff’s Department
 New Hampshire Mutual Aid Systems
 Twin State Mutual Aid Dispatch Center
 Woodsville Ambulance Service
 Groton, VT FAST Squad
 Lisbon, NH Life Squad
 Streaming online at RadioReference.com

Emergency services in New Hampshire
Emergency services in Vermont
Firefighting in New Hampshire
Firefighting in Vermont